The 2020–21 Bristol City W.F.C. season was the club's fifth season under the Bristol City affiliation and the organisation's 22nd overall season in existence. It was their fourth consecutive full season in the FA Women's Super League following promotion to the 2017 Spring Season. Along with competing in the WSL, the club also competed in two domestic cup competitions: the FA Cup and the League Cup.

In a bid to enable increased attendances amid COVID-19 restrictions and social distancing measures, Bristol City announced they were moving from the 1,500 capacity Stoke Gifford Stadium in Filton which had been purpose-built by the club in 2011 ahead of the first WSL season, to Twerton Park, an 8,800 capacity stadium home to Bath City FC. On 2 September, Jasmine Matthews was named as captain following the departure of Loren Dykes.

On 15 January 2021, Tanya Oxtoby temporarily stepped down as head coach to take maternity leave. Two-time WSL winner Matt Beard, who had left West Ham United in November, was appointed caretaker manager until the end of the season.

Squad

FA Women's Super League

Results summary

Results by matchday

Results

League table

Women's FA Cup 

As a member of the top two tiers, Bristol City will enter FA Cup in the fourth round proper. Originally scheduled to take place on 31 January 2021, it was delayed due to COVID-19 restrictions.

FA Women's League Cup

Group stage

Knockout stage

Squad statistics

Appearances 

Starting appearances are listed first, followed by substitute appearances after the + symbol where applicable.

|-
|colspan="14"|Players who appeared for the club but left during the season:

|}

Transfers

Transfers in

Loans in

Transfers out

References 

Bristol City